Peter George Donnelly (born June 14, 1948) is an American retired professional ice hockey goaltender. He played professionally for several teams including the New York Raiders, Quebec Nordiques and Vancouver Blazers of the World Hockey Association (WHA).

Career
Donnelly played junior hockey with the QHA Quebec A's, the OHA Ottawa 67's and Kitchener Rangers before turning pro with the Quebec Aces of the American Hockey League (AHL) in 1970. He was selected by the New York Raiders in the 1972 selection draft and he joined the Raiders that season, playing 47 games. In the off-season, he was traded to the Vancouver Blazers, where he played one season before playing with the minor Tulsa Oilers in 1974–75. He joined the Quebec Nordiques organization in the off-season and he played with the Maine Nordiques for the season, with a four-game callup with the Quebec club. He was out of hockey in 1976–77, but played one more season professionally with the Long Beach Sharks/Rockets of the Pacific Hockey League in 1977–78 before retiring from professional ice hockey.

External links

1948 births
American men's ice hockey goaltenders
Ice hockey people from Detroit
Kitchener Rangers players
Living people
Maine Nordiques players
New York Raiders players
Ottawa 67's players
Quebec Aces (AHL) players
Quebec Nordiques (WHA) players
Roanoke Valley Rebels (SHL) players
Tulsa Oilers (1964–1984) players
Vancouver Blazers players

References